A media pilgrimage refers to visits made to the sites mentioned in popular media. These may be real or fictional.

Instances

The British soap opera Coronation Street is described as a media pilgrimage site, as are the locations of the various James Bond films and The X-Files.

References

Popular culture studies